The 2006 Mid-American Conference women's basketball tournament was the post-season basketball tournament for the Mid-American Conference (MAC) 2005–06 college basketball season. The 2006 tournament was held March 4–11, 2006. Regular season champion Bowling Green won their second straight championship over Kent State. Ali Mann of Bowling Green was the MVP.

Format
The top two seeds in each division received byes into the quarterfinals. The first round was played at campus sites. All other rounds were held at Quicken Loans Arena.

Bracket

All-Tournament Team
Tournament MVP – Ali Mann, Bowling Green

References

Mid-American Conference women's basketball tournament
2005–06 Mid-American Conference women's basketball season
MAC women's basketball tournament
MAC women's basketball tournament
Basketball competitions in Cleveland
College basketball tournaments in Ohio
Women's sports in Ohio
2000s in Cleveland